William Charles "Cherokee" Fisher (November 1844 – September 26, 1912) was an American Major League Baseball pitcher who played in the National Association from 1871 to 1875 and the National League in 1876 and 1878.

Career
Fisher was a pitcher during organized baseball's formative years, from about 1867 to the end of his career in 1878. He was known for his fastball on the field and his heavy drinking off it. William J. Ryczek wrote: There appeared to be a connection between a predilection for alcohol and the tendency to revolve [i.e., change teams frequently]... Cherokee Fisher, whose meandering will be detailed later, was another case which strengthens this connection. A heavy consumer of alcohol would logically be much more susceptible to the overtures of other clubs, as well as more likely to be in need of money. He played for the West Philadelphias in 1867, the Cincinnati Buckeyes in 1868, the Troy Haymakers in 1869 and 1870, and the Chicago Dreadnaughts in 1870 as well.

He played for the Rockford Forest Citys, Baltimore Canaries, Athletic of Philadelphia, Hartford Dark Blues, Philadelphia White Stockings, Cincinnati Reds, and Providence Grays. He repeated as ERA champion the next season while pitching for the Philadelphia Athletics, posting a nearly identical 1.81 mark. On May 2, he gave up the first home run in National League history to Chicago White Stockings star Ross Barnes. After retiring, Fisher served for many years in the Chicago Fire Department.

See also
List of Major League Baseball career ERA leaders
List of Major League Baseball annual shutout leaders

References

External links

1844 births
1912 deaths
19th-century baseball players
Major League Baseball pitchers
Cincinnati Buckeyes players
Troy Haymakers (NABBP) players
Rockford Forest Citys players
Baltimore Canaries players
Philadelphia Athletics (NA) players
Hartford Dark Blues players
Philadelphia White Stockings players
Cincinnati Reds (1876–1879) players
Providence Grays players
Baseball players from Philadelphia